John Pooley (1645-1712) was a member of the Church of Ireland, who was Bishop of Cloyne from 1697 to 1702, then Bishop of Raphoe until his death in October 1712.

Career

Born in Ipswich around 1645, Pooley was educated at St Patrick's Cathedral Grammar School, in Dublin, the future Duke of Marlborough being one of his classmates. He graduated from Trinity College, where he became a senior fellow.
He was appointed the vicar of the Parish of Leixlip, St Mary's and served in this position from 1670 to 1674.
He was appointed Prebendary of St. Michan's Church, Dublin, then Dean of Ossory on 6 March 1674. He served as personal chaplain to the Earl of Essex, Lord Lieutenant of Ireland from 1672 to 1677, as well as his successor, the Duke of Ormond. One of Ormond' positions was that of Chancellor of Oxford University, and Pooley was made Doctor of Divinity there in July 1682.  

On 2 December 1697, he was consecrated Bishop of Cloyne, spending much of his time on an unsuccessful legal campaign to regain episcopal lands lost in prior decades. In 1702, he became Bishop of Raphoe in Ulster, one of the more valuable sees; in 1714, Archbishop King described it as 'worth near £1,200...(but) full of Dissenters and Papists'. A contemporary complained in the eleven years he served as bishop, Pooley 'hardly resided eighteen months.' 

As a bishop, Pooley sat in the Irish House of Lords and spoke against the 1703 Popery Act. He specifically objected to the requirement office holders abjure or deny the claim of the Catholic Stuart exiles, and avoided doing so himself until 1710. As a result, he was briefly deprived of his bishopric before having it restored in September 1710.  He was briefly held in Dublin Castle in 1709 for protesting against a Parliamentary session being scheduled on a Holy day. 

Pooley was responsible for restoring St. Michan's Church, Dublin, described as being in a 'ruinous condition' in the 1680s, and the expansion of St Eunan's Cathedral. His will left £200 for a building programme, which was not completed until years after his death. Most of it was replaced in the late 19th century, apart from a baptismal font installed in 1706, which can still be seen.  

He died in Dublin on 16 October 1712, and was buried in St. Michan's.

References

Sources
 
 
 
 
 
 
 
 
 

1645 births
1712 deaths
Clergy from Ipswich
Alumni of Trinity College Dublin
Deans of Ossory
Bishops of Cloyne
Bishops of Raphoe
17th-century Anglican bishops in Ireland
18th-century Anglican bishops in Ireland